Worth County Courthouse is a historic courthouse located at Grant City, Worth County, Missouri.  It was built in 1898–1899, and is a 2 1/2-story, rectangular, brown brick building with elements of the Classical Revival and Renaissance Revival style.  It has a hipped roof with dormers topped by a galvanized iron tower with a clock face on each facade.  It has round arched opening and features a portico of three semi-elliptical arches and parapet.

It was listed on the National Register of Historic Places in 1983.

References

County courthouses in Missouri
Courthouses on the National Register of Historic Places in Missouri
Neoclassical architecture in Missouri
Renaissance Revival architecture in Missouri
Government buildings completed in 1899
Buildings and structures in Worth County, Missouri
National Register of Historic Places in Worth County, Missouri